Jeff Bower may refer to:

 Jeff Bower (American football) (born 1953), American college football coach
 Jeff Bower (basketball) (born 1961), American basketball executive